Tellurium bromide may refer to:

Ditellurium bromide, Te2Br
Tellurium tetrabromide, TeBr4